The 2022–23 Everton F.C. (women) season is the club's sixth consecutive campaign in the Women's Super League, the highest level of the football pyramid. Along with competing in the WSL, the club will also contest two domestic cup competitions: the FA Cup and the League Cup.

On 8 April 2022, it was announced Brian Sørensen would become the Everton manager ahead of the 2022–23 season. He had been manager of Fortuna Hjørring since July 2021. Everton had seen out the previous season with an interim managerial team of Chris Roberts and Claire Ditchburn following the sacking of Jean-Luc Vasseur in February 2022.

Squad

Preseason

Women's Super League

Results summary

Results by matchday

Results

League table

Women's FA Cup 

As a member of the first tier, Everton entered the FA Cup in the fourth round proper.

FA Women's League Cup

Squad statistics

Appearances 

Starting appearances are listed first, followed by substitute appearances after the + symbol where applicable.

|-
|colspan="14"|Players who appeared for the club but left during the season:

|}

Transfers

Transfers in

Loans in

Transfers out

Loans out

References 

Everton F.C. (women) seasons
Everton